Remixes of Love is a 1994 remix album by American R&B/pop singer, Jody Watley. Released in Japan only, the album is Watley's second full-length compilation of remixes after You Wanna Dance with Me?. Watley's Remixes of Love contains remixes of select songs from the albums Affairs of the Heart and Intimacy.

Track listing

Personnel
Jody Watley – vocals, background vocals
Larry "Rock" Campbell – keyboards, drum programming, 
André Cymone – background vocals, drums, bass guitar, keyboards
David Morales – drums
Peter "Ski" Schwartz – piano
Brenda White-King, Paulette McWilliams, Alfa Anderson Barfield – background vocals on "I'm the One You Need".

Production
 Remix producers – David Morales, P.M. Dawn, Bobby Brooks, Larry Robinson, Dave Way, Meech Wells

References

Jody Watley albums
1994 remix albums
MCA Records remix albums